Myalgia (also called muscle pain and muscle ache in layman's terms) is the medical term for muscle pain.  Myalgia is a symptom of many diseases. The most common cause of acute myalgia is the overuse of a muscle or group of muscles; another likely cause is viral infection, especially when there has been no trauma.

Long-lasting myalgia can be caused by metabolic myopathy, some nutritional deficiencies, and chronic fatigue syndrome.

Causes
The most common causes of myalgia are overuse, injury, and strain. Myalgia might also be caused by allergies, diseases, medications, or as a response to a vaccination. Dehydration at times results in muscle pain as well, especially for people involved in extensive physical activities such as workout.

Muscle pain is also a common symptom in a variety of diseases, including infectious diseases, such as influenza, muscle abscesses, Lyme disease, malaria, trichinosis or poliomyelitis; autoimmune diseases, such as celiac disease, systemic lupus erythematosus, Sjögren's syndrome or polymyositis; gastrointestinal diseases, such as non-celiac gluten sensitivity (which can also occur without digestive symptoms) and inflammatory bowel disease (including Crohn's disease and ulcerative colitis).

The most common causes are:

Overuse
Overuse of a muscle is using it too much, too soon or too often. One example is repetitive strain injury. See also:
 Exercise
 Weight lifting

Injury
The most common causes of myalgia by injury are: sprains and strains.

Autoimmune
 Multiple sclerosis (neurologic pain interpreted as muscular)
 Myositis
 Mixed connective tissue disease
 Lupus erythematosus
 Fibromyalgia syndrome
 Familial Mediterranean fever
 Polyarteritis nodosa
 Devic's disease
 Morphea
 Sarcoidosis

Metabolic defect
 Carnitine palmitoyltransferase II deficiency
 Conn's syndrome
 Adrenal insufficiency
 Hyperthyroidism
 Hypothyroidism
 Diabetes
 Hypogonadism
 Postorgasmic illness syndrome

Other
 Chronic fatigue syndrome (aka myalgic encephalomyelitis)
 Channelopathy
 Ehlers Danlos Syndrome
 Stickler Syndrome
 Hypokalemia
 Hypotonia
 Exercise intolerance
 Mastocytosis
 Peripheral neuropathy
 Eosinophilia myalgia syndrome
 Barcoo Fever
 Herpes
 Hemochromatosis
 Delayed onset muscle soreness
 HIV/AIDS
 Generalized anxiety disorder
 Tumor-induced osteomalacia
 Hypovitaminosis D
 Infarction

Withdrawal syndrome from certain drugs
Sudden cessation of high-dose corticosteroids, opioids, barbiturates, benzodiazepines, caffeine, or alcohol can induce myalgia.

Treatment
When the cause of myalgia is unknown, it should be treated symptomatically. Common treatments include heat, rest, paracetamol, NSAIDs, massage, cryotherapy and muscle relaxants.

See also
 Arthralgia
 Myopathy
 Myositis

References

External links

Symptoms and signs: Nervous and musculoskeletal systems
Soft tissue disorders
Pain